Sebastian Dominik Kęciek (born 1990) is a Polish official, since 2022 he serves as an ambassador to Hungary.

Life 
Kęciek attended high school in Mońki. He graduated from international relations at the Jagiellonian University in Kraków. He studied also administration at the Jagiellonian University and political science at the Jesuit University of Philosophy and Education Ignatianum in Kraków. He was also trained at the IESE Business School, Spain, the European Academcy of Diplomacy, Poland and the Eötvös Loránd University in Budapest. As a student he was a member of the association Students for the Republic (Studenci dla Rzeczypospolitej). He has authored articles on politics of Hungary.

Between 2017 and 2019 he worked for the Ministry of National Education, being promoted from an expert to the head of the International Cooperation Department. On that post he was responsible for the coordination of bilateral cooperation and relations with organizations operating in Poland and abroad for the benefit of Polish diaspora. He was member of the Polish Diaspora Education Council, the Holocaust Education Council and the Polish-Ukrainian Youth Exchange Council. From 2019 to 2022 he was deputy director and director of the International Projects Coordination Department at the Chancellery of the Prime Minister of Poland covering issues of foreign policy analysis, public and cultural diplomacy, providing services to foreign journalists and stakeholders.

On 17 March 202, Kęciek was nominated to be the ambassador to Hungary, and was subsequently presented with his letter of credence on 19 April 2022.

He is married, father to a son and a daughter.

References 

1990 births
Ambassadors of Poland to Hungary
Living people
Jagiellonian University alumni